Abundant life is a term used primarily in Christianity.

Abundant life may also refer to:

Organizations 
 Abundant Life Prayer Group, a 24-hour-a-day prayer team
 Abundant Life Church, a large Christian neocharismatic church based in Bradford, England
 Abundant Life Ministries; see Abundant Life Church
 Abundant Life Centre; see Abundant Life Church
 Abundant Life Ministries; see College of the Mainland
 Abundant Life Church, in Lithonia; see Elizabeth Omilami
 Abundant Life Baptist Church; see Matt Bartle
 Abundant Life Baptist Church; see Singapore Baptist Convention
 Abundant Life Lutheran Church; see Julius Fahr
 Abundant Life Assemblies of God; see Norman Ligairi
 Abundant Life Fellowship Church; see Lou Brock
 Abundant Life Fellowship Church; see Wadsworth, Texas
 Abundant Life Center; see List of New Thought denominations and independent centers
 Abundant Life Cathedral; see LaKisha Jones
 Kaitaia Abundant Life School, a Christian school
 Abundant Life School; see Sherwood, Arkansas
 Abundant Life Christian School; see La Unión, Lempira
 Abundant Life Christian School; see Wilmington, Massachusetts
 Abundant Life Academy; see Hardeeville, South Carolina
 Abundant Life Seeds; see Seedy Sunday
 Abundant Life Broadcasting; see K20JX-D

Television, film, and music 
 Abundant Life (song):
 Grammy Awards of 1989
 BeBe Winans
 Ronald Winans
 Isaiah Jones, Jr.
 The More Abundant Life (episode); see America: A Personal History of the United States
 Abundant Life (series); see John Reynolds Ministries
 Abundant Life Choir; see Danny Eason
 The Abundant Life (program):
 Eternal Word Television Network
 Mark Miravalle

Books, magazines, short stories, and articles 
 Hidden Treasures: Abundant Life in the Riches of Proverbs (1998); see Gloria Copeland
 Abundant Life (magazine); see Abundant life, section Origin
 The Abundant Life Bible Amplifier (book series):
 Jon Dybdahl
 Alden Thompson
 Jon Paulien
 The Abundant Life (1908); see Rufus Jones
 The Healing Path: How the Hurts in Your Past Can Lead You to a More Abundant Life (2000); see Dan Allender
 The More Abundant Life (1939); see Francis M. Wilcox
 Abundant life (short story) (1943); see Nam Cao
 Abundant Life Together at the Refugee Camp (magazine article) (1938); see Nanking Massacre controversy and denial

Other uses 
 The More Abundant Life, a phrase used by the U.S. President Franklin D. Roosevelt
 Theistic evolution
 Relationship between religion and science

See also 
 Abundant Living Faith Center
 Power for Abundant Living
 Abundant living system
 Studies in Abundant Living Series